The Eljigin people are a Khalkha Mongolian sub-ethnic group. They live in  Zavhan province. The name sounds similar to Mongolian word "el" for "this" and to Turkic word "tegin" for "lord"

References

Mongol peoples
Mongols
Darlikin Mongols
Ethnic groups in Mongolia